Cherkala is a small town located in the Kasaragod district of the Indian state of Kerala. Attractions in and around Cherkala include Thooku Paalam bridge, which crosses the Chandragiri River, and the forest of the nearby village of Paika. L.B.S College of Engineering is located nearby.

References

 Suburbs of Kasaragod

 Cities and towns in Kasaragod district